This is a list of episodes for Back at the Barnyard. Each season has 26 episodes, and a total of 52 episodes were produced, spanning 2 seasons.

Series overview

Episodes

Film (2006)

Season 1 (2007–09)

Season 2 (2009–11)

Home media

References

Lists of American children's animated television series episodes
Lists of Nickelodeon television series episodes
Back at the Barnyard